Büyükkışla is a village in the District of Şereflikoçhisar, Ankara Province, Turkey. The village is populated by both Kurds and Turks.

Notable people 
 Selçuk Öztürk (born 1972), Dutch politician of Turkish descent

References 

Villages in Şereflikoçhisar District

Kurdish settlements in Ankara Province